Ryder Anderson is an American football defensive end for the New York Giants of the National Football League (NFL). He played college football at Ole Miss and Indiana.

Early life
Anderson was born in Katy, Texas. His older brother,  Rodney, was an all-state running back. Both Andersons won separate state championships in 2012 and 2015, respectively,  at perennial Texas high school football power Katy High School. Ryder began high school as a quarterback but quickly outgrew the position, so his head coach switched him to defensive lineman.

College career
On November 28, 2016, Anderson committed to Ole Miss. At Ole Miss, Anderson had 98 tackles, 15 for a loss, 9.5 sacks, one pass defended, one fumble recovered, and one forced fumble. On January 4, 2021, Anderson entered the college football transfer portal. Four days later, he transferred to Indiana. At Indiana, he had 47 tackles, 7.5 tackles for loss, 2.5 sacks, and 1 forced fumble. Overall in his college career, he had 147 total tackles, 22.5 total tackles for loss, 9.5 total sacks, one defended pass, one recovered fumble, and two total forced fumbles. After the 2021 season, Anderson declared for the 2022 NFL draft.

Professional career
Anderson went undrafted in the 2022 NFL Draft. He signed with the New York Giants as an undrafted free agent on May 14, 2022. He was waived on August 30, 2022 and signed to the practice squad the next day. Anderson was elevated from the practice squad for Week 6 and Week 7 games against the Baltimore Ravens and Jacksonville Jaguars. He was promoted to the active roster on December 16.

References

External links
New York Giants bio
Indiana Hoosiers bio
Ole Miss Rebels bio

New York Giants players
1998 births
Living people
American football defensive ends
Ole Miss Rebels football players
Indiana Hoosiers football players